Shannon Gabrielle Valley is an American climate scientist and policy advisor. She is based at Georgia Tech, where she studies the climate history of planet Earth. She worked as a liaison between the White House and NASA Headquarters for the Obama administration. In 2020 Valley was appointed to Joe Biden's NASA transition team.

Education and early career 
Valley spent her childhood in St. Louis and Houston. She attended public high school, where she first discovered science through introductory courses. She eventually worked toward a bachelor's degree in political science at Northwestern University. After graduating, Valley joined the Obama administration. She took part in Camp Obama, a gathering for organisers working on the 2008 campaign. She spent five years working between scientists at NASA Headquarters and the United States Congress. She enjoyed meeting the scientists, but became frustrated that she was not doing her own research. The impact of Hurricane Katrina on her Houston community inspired her to want to contribute more herself. Having decided that she wanted more formal training to become a scientist, Valley started to complete night courses in advanced mathematics. Valley was awarded a National Science Foundation graduate research fellowship (NSF-GRFP), and joined Georgia Tech as a graduate student, where she worked under the supervision of Jean Lynch-Stieglitz.

Research and career 
After earning her doctorate, Valley was appointed as a postdoctoral researcher in paleoceanography. In 2020 Valley was appointed to Joe Biden's NASA transition team, who serve to advise the president-elect in preparation for the inauguration.

Selected publications

References 

Georgia Tech alumni
Northwestern University alumni
People from St. Louis
Living people
Year of birth missing (living people)